"The Way You Move" is a song by American recording artist Ne-Yo. The song features American singers Trey Songz and T-Pain. The official video for the song premiered on October 27, 2011, on Ne-Yo's official VEVO channel. The song was released to iTunes as a promotional single on November 15, it was originally recorded to be part of the track list of the album R.E.D. (Realizing Every Dream), but later the song was removed of the final track list 2011.

Chart performance 
For the week ending November 19, 2011, "The Way You Move" debuted at number one on the South Korean International Singles Chart, selling over 119,000 digital downloads.

Charts

Certifications

References

External links
 .

2011 songs
Ne-Yo songs
T-Pain songs
Trey Songz songs
Songs written by Ne-Yo
Songs written by T-Pain
Songs written by Trey Songz